Margaret Hoard (ca. 1880–1944) American sculptor and painter born in Washington, Iowa. She studied in New York City at the Art Students League with Fraser and Aitken and painting with Arthur Wesley Dow.

Hoard was one of the artists who exhibited at the Armory Show of 1913, which included one of her sculptures, a plaster entitled Study of an old lady ($75).

Her marble carving, Eve is owned by the Metropolitan Museum of Art.

She was a member of the National Association of Women Painters and Sculptors.

References

1880s births
1944 deaths
20th-century American painters
American women sculptors
People from Washington, Iowa
20th-century American sculptors
20th-century American women artists
National Association of Women Artists members
Painters from Iowa
Art Students League of New York alumni
Sculptors from New York (state)
Sculptors from Iowa